Kasarani is a commercial and residential neighbourhood in Nairobi. Kasarani is also used in reference to the city's sub-county with the same name, which spans through neighbourhoods in the northeastern areas of Nairobi.

Location

However, the greater Kasarani area has other suburbs domiciled within it. The area shares common boundaries with what was Kasarani Division prior to 2013. Areas that are electorally placed in Roysambu, Ruaraka, part of Kasarani, and part of Emabakasi North constituencies are within the Kasarani Sub-county of Nairobi.

Naming
It is thought that the name Kasarani originated from a river that flows through the area which has the Kikuyu name "Gathara-ini" River.

Sports
Kasarani is home to the Moi International Sports Centre (Alias. Kasarani Stadium), named after former President Daniel arap Moi. The sports complex has a stadium, gymnasium, swimming pool and hotel. The stadium is used by the Harambee Stars for international matches, and is the home stadium of Mathare United and Tusker F.C. of the Kenyan Premier League.

The indoor arena is used for volleyball, and is the home venue for the Kenya women's national volleyball team.

Notable landmarks
Kasarani is home to the USIU Africa and Pan African Christian University campuses. Kasarani Technical and Vocational College in Kamulu, Ruai. The Sportview Hotel and  Safari Park Hotel are also here. The area also has the Garden City, and Thika Road malls shopping complexes off the Thika Road highway.

Notable businesses
Kasarani is served by several shopping mails such as Mountain Mall, Thika Road Mall and Garden City. Kasarani Portal, an enterprise listing businesses in Kasarani is located in Seasons Estate.

See also
 Githurai
 Kahawa
 Dandora
 Ongata Rongai

References

External links
 Website of USIU Africa

Suburbs of Nairobi
Populated places in Kenya
Nairobi